Three ships of the Royal Fleet Auxiliary have borne the name RFA Appleleaf:

  was a  tanker launched in 1916 as RFA Texol, renamed RFA Appleleaf in 1917 and broken up in 1947.
  was a  tanker launched in 1955 as George Lyras. She was purchased by the RFA in 1959 and returned to her owners in 1970.
 RFA Appleleaf (A79) was a Leaf-class tanker launched in 1975 as Hudson Cavalier and taken into service in 1979.

Royal Fleet Auxiliary ship names